CorpComms is a monthly trade magazine targeted at the in-house communicator. Published in London, it is distributed throughout the UK and internationally.

The magazine offers advice and articles on a range of topical subjects, such as social media, digital media, internal communications, sponsorship and corporate social responsibility.

The magazine runs regular features including interviews with leading in-house communicators, experts offering their 'top ten tips' on a variety of topics, and a focus on recent corporate rebrandings. New initiatives include personal views written by in-house communicators and an analysis of developments in the world of media.

CorpComms also publishes a weekly newsletter and hosts a website of the same name.

History
CorpComms was launched in June 2005 as a bi-monthly publication by Cross Border Group. The launch editor was Jana Sanchez, who left when the magazine moved to a monthly publication cycle, to establish financial PR agency City Savvy. Helen Dunne became editor in January 2006. In its first year, CorpComms was shortlisted in the Best Launch category at the Independent Publisher Awards. CorpComms was the subject of a management buyout by long standing editor Helen Dunne in July 2008, and is now published by her new company, Hardy Media.

Contributors and reporters 

Notable regular contributors to CorpComms include:

Rosie Murray-West
Caroline Poynton 
Simon Goodley 

Clare Harrison
Mark Leftly 
Andrew Cave

CorpComms 100 Club 

The CorpComms 100 Club was established in October 2007. It is an organisation which recognises the top performing corporate communicators in the UK 

Previous member have included:

Adrian Bevington
Guy Black
Simon Lewis
Guto Harri
Leyan Phillips

Events 

CorpComms hosts a national awards ceremony every year. The CorpComms awards were launched in 2006 and celebrate excellence in corporate communications. They include, amongst others, awards for Best corporate publication; Best annual report; Best employee communications; Best crisis management; Best CSR strategy and overall grand prix winner.

In September 2010 CorpComms magazine launched the inaugural Digi Awards.The awards were launched in order to acknowledge how digital and social media are changing the way that organizations communicate with their various stakeholder communities. The Digi Awards programme ran for eight years, with the last Digi Awards ceremony taking place in 2017.

CorpComms also organizes a range of events targeting the key issues faced by in-house communicators such as digital media and sustainability.

Editor 

Helen Dunne has worked in journalism for more than 20 years. An economics graduate, Helen started her career on International Financing Review, the weekly bible for the capital markets. She joined The Daily Telegraph in 1993, where she spent ten years, latterly as associate City editor. Helen then spent two years as deputy City editor of The Mail on Sunday, where she was shortlisted for Business Journalist of the Year, before embarking on a freelance career. She has written for many publications, including The Business, The Observer, The Sunday Telegraph and The Sun.

Dunne has also written three novels, including Trixie Trader about a fictional City trader 
, based on a column in the Daily Telegraph.

References

External links 
 
 CIPR
 PRCA

Business magazines published in the United Kingdom
Monthly magazines published in the United Kingdom
Magazines established in 2005
Professional and trade magazines